Paroreomyza is a genus of Hawaiian honeycreeper in the subfamily Carduelinae of the family Fringillidae. These birds are endemic to Hawaii.

Taxonomy 
Paroreomyza, along with Oreomystis (although their alliance is disputed), is the second most basal genus of Hawaiian honeycreeper to survive to recent times, with the most basal being the recently extinct poʻouli (Melamprosops phaeosoma), with Paroreomyza and Oreomystis having diverged from the rest of the lineage about 4.7 million years ago. Members of Paroreomyza do not have two key phenotypic traits present in Oreomystis and the more derived Hawaiian honeycreepers: a distinct musty odor and a squared-off tongue. Following the extinction of the poʻouli, it (along with Oreomystis if they are considered sister genera) is the most basal group of Hawaiian honeycreepers still surviving, although it too has lost most of its species.

Species
It includes the following species:
 Kākāwahie (Paroreomyza flammea) — extinct (1963)
 Oʻahu ʻalauahio (Paroreomyza maculata) — probably extinct (late 1960s to mid 1980s?)
 Maui Nui ʻalauahio  (Paroreomyza montana)
 Lanaʻi ʻalauahio (Paroreomyza montana montana) — extinct (1937)
 Maui ʻalauahio (Paroreomyza montana newtoni)

See also

References

 
Hawaiian honeycreepers
Endemic fauna of Hawaii
Bird genera
Carduelinae
Higher-level bird taxa restricted to the Australasia-Pacific region
Taxa named by Robert Cyril Layton Perkins
Taxonomy articles created by Polbot